Cover's theorem is a statement in computational learning theory and is one of the primary theoretical motivations for the use of non-linear kernel methods in machine learning applications. It is so termed after the information theorist Thomas M. Cover who stated it in 1965, referring to it as counting function theorem.

The Theorem  

The theorem expresses the number of homogeneously linearly separable sets of  points in  dimensions as an explicit counting function  of the number of points  and the dimensionality .

It requires, as a necessary and sufficient condition, that the points are in general position. Simply put, this means that the points should be as linearly independent (non-aligned) as possible. This condition is satisfied "with probability 1" or almost surely for random point sets, while it may easily be violated for real data, since these are often structured along smaller-dimensionality manifolds within the data space.

This limiting quantity is also known as the Vapnik-Chervonenkis dimension of the linear classifier.
 
  For , the counting function starts growing less than exponentially . This means that, given a sample of fixed size , for larger dimensionality  it is more probable that a random set of labelled points is linearly separable.

A consequence of the theorem is that given a set of training data that is not linearly separable, one can with high probability transform it into a training set that is linearly separable by projecting it into a higher-dimensional space via some non-linear transformation, or:

Proof 
The proof of Cover's counting function theorem can be obtained from the recursive relation

 

To show that, with fixed , increasing  may turn a set of points from non-separable to separable, a deterministic mapping may be used: suppose there are  points. Lift them onto the vertices of the simplex in the  dimensional real space. Since every partition of the samples into two sets is separable by a linear separator, the property follows.

See also 
 Support vector machine
 Kernel method

References

 (Section 3.5)

Computational learning theory
Statistical classification
Artificial neural networks